Midde Ramulu (born 1941 - 25 November 2010) was an Indian folklore artist. He is a popular exponent of Oggu Katha.

Early life
Midde Ramulu was born in Hanmajipeta village of Vemulawada, Rajanna Sircilla district, Telangana. He did not go to school.

Career
Midde Ramulu was popular and toured many countries. He is popular for his Renuka Yellamma katha, Mallanna katha, Gangagauri, Balanagamma or any other mythological story, he depicted all characters of the stories before the eyes of the spellbound audience with his style.

He was also a member of the AP State Cultural Council.

Death
He died after suffering from cancer..

References

External links
 The Hindu article on Midde Ramulu

Folk artists
People from Telangana
People from Karimnagar
2010 deaths
1941 births